The Captain's Daughter is an 1836 novel by Alexander Pushkin.

The Captain's Daughter may also refer to:

 The Captain's Daughter (opera), a 1911 Russian opera by Cui
The Captain's Daughter (album), an album by Eight Bells
The Captain's Daughter (1947 film), an Italian adventure film
The Captain's Daughter (1958 film), a Soviet drama film